Alistair Mackenzie may be a misspelling for:

 Alister MacKenzie (1870–1934), British golf course architect
 Alastair Mackenzie (born 1970), Scottish actor